James B. Steele (born January 3, 1943) is an American investigative journalist and author. With longtime collaborator Donald L. Barlett he has won two Pulitzer Prizes, two National Magazine Awards and five George Polk Awards during their thirty five years of service at The Philadelphia Inquirer, Time, and Vanity Fair. The duo are frequently referred to as Barlett and Steele.

Biography 
Steele was born in Hutchinson, Kansas and was raised in Kansas City, Missouri. He graduated from the University of Missouri–Kansas City and began his career at the Kansas City Times, where he covered politics, labor and urban affairs.  In 1970 he joined The Philadelphia Inquirer, where he would begin his collaboration with Barlett. 
 
In a 1972 collaboration for The Philadelphia Inquirer, Steele and Barlett pioneered the use of computers for the analysis of data on violent crimes.  Their story, "Auditing the IRS," earned them a Gerald Loeb Special Award in 1975. Twenty years later, they co-authored the series America: What Went Wrong? for The Inquirer, which was named as one of the 100 best pieces of journalism of the 20th century by the New York University School of Journalism.  Rewritten into book form, America: What Went Wrong? became a No. 1 New York Times bestseller.  It is one of seven books Steele and Barlett have published.  In 1989, he and Barlett won the Pulitzer Prize and the Gerald Loeb Award for Large Newspapers for their reporting on the Tax Reform Act of 1986.

Barlett and Steele left The Philadelphia Inquirer to become editors-at-large at Time Inc. in 1997. While at Time, they won two National Magazine Awards, the first in 1999 for their three-part series, “What Corporate Welfare Costs You," and the second in 2001 for their three-part series in 2000 on campaign finance.

In 2006 Barlett and Steele left Time and were hired by Vanity Fair to be contributing editors on the understanding that they would contribute two articles each year. They were available for this new assignment after Time determined that they had insufficient space for the time of long journalistic investigations. In 2007, Barlett and Steele were featured in the PBS documentary series, Exposé: America's Investigative Reports, in an episode entitled "Friends In High Places."

In January 2017, it was reported that CNN, as part of "a major new initiative in investigative reporting," was hiring Steele along with fellow Pulitzer Prize winner Carl Bernstein as contributing editors, "to advise the team on their work and executives on hiring."

Steele is married and has a daughter. His sister Lisa Steele is a video artist living in Canada.

Published works

Books

Newspaper articles

"America: What Went Wrong?"

"America: Who Stole the Dream?"

Magazine articles

References

External links 

 Don Barlett and Jim Steele's website
 Barlett & Steele Awards for Investigative Business Journalism 
 Terry Gross's interview about gambling on reservations with Barlett & Steele on NPR's Fresh Air (16 December 2002)
 Terry Gross's interview "The Big Business of Health Care" with Barlett & Steele on NPR's Fresh Air (6 October 2004)
 Exposé:"Friends in High Places" on PBS (July 2007)
 Liberadio(!) Interview with Don Barlett (12 February 2007)
 
In Depth interview with Barlett and Steele, January 6, 2013

1943 births
Living people
American investigative journalists
American political writers
The Philadelphia Inquirer people
Time (magazine) people
Vanity Fair (magazine) people
People from Hutchinson, Kansas
American male journalists
Pulitzer Prize for National Reporting winners
Gerald Loeb Award winners for Large Newspapers
Gerald Loeb Special Award winners